Investment decisions are made by investors and investment managers. These decision are made based on the finding of analysis tools based on data available about the companies.

Investors commonly perform investment analysis by making use of fundamental analysis, technical analysis and gut feel.

Investment decisions are often supported by decision tools. The portfolio theory is often applied to help the investor achieve a satisfactory return compared to the risk taken.

Investment decision biases
Bad decisions are often followed by a feeling of investor's remorse.

See also
 Behavioral finance
 Cognitive bias
 Relative strength
 Ratio analysis

References 

Investment